CR Brands is a consumer goods company formed in 2006 by Allied Capital through a merger of two of its subsidiaries.

History
Allied Capital acquired ChemPro, Inc., in March 2006. Allied then merged Redox and ChemPro, Inc., with the resulting company being renamed CR Brands. ChemPro's Chief Executive Officer retained the title through the merger with Richard Owen being named Chief Operating Officer.  Manufacturing of the Redox brands would be moved to the ChemPro plants.  With Allied Capital coming into financial difficulties, Juggernaut Capital Partners LP purchased CR from them in 2009.  Juggernaut sold CR to Resilience Capital Partners' Resilience Fund III LP in September 2012.

Brands
 Biz
 Oxydol
 Dryel
Mean Green
 Pine Power
 Magnum Power

See also
 ChemPro, Inc.
 Redox Brands
 Prestige Brands, also owns former P&G brands

External links
Official website

References

Companies based in Ohio